Bibliography of Prem Rawat and related organizations lists bibliographical material regarding Prem Rawat and organizations like Divine Light Mission, Elan Vital and the Prem Rawat Foundation.

Legenda
 Except in verbatim quotations (of titles etc.) Prem Rawat is always listed under that name in the columns below, whatever the dominant alternative name (Guru Maharaj Ji, Maharaji,...) at the time of the publication.
 Click  icon to sort table according to entries in the column under it.

References

External links
 
 

Prem Rawat
Rawat, Prem